The Okavango mud turtle or Okavango terrapin) (Pelusios bechuanicus) is a species of turtle in the family Pelomedusidae endemic to Africa. It is found in Angola, Botswana, the Democratic Republic of the Congo, Namibia (Caprivi), Zambia, and Zimbabwe.

Distribution
Found in central Africa, central Angola, northeastern Namibia, northern Botswana, Zimbabwe, and Zambia

Description
The Okavango mud turtle is the largest species of the genus Pelusios.  The carapace is oval and elongated, with a pronounced dome, and is evenly rounded at the edges which allows the turtle to appear as a smooth rock.  The carapace is very dark, often almost black, and lightens up to yellow or orange only at the sides.  The plastron is well developed and can close the shell completely, with a rounded front lobe that comes together to form the hinge that is characteristic of the genus.

Biology
The turtle is observed most often in clear, deep, calm waters, in rivers, and in vegetation-choked swamps.  It is a semi-aquatic animal that remains in the water most of the year.  It is observed outside of the water habitat only when seeking temporary aquatic refuge during the dry season.  The breeding season occurs during the southern summer and nests are quite large, between 20 and 50 eggs.  The turtle is most frequent prey to the shoe-billed stork and it is characteristically a carnivore, feeding on fish and invertebrates.

References

Bibliography

Okavango mud turtle
Reptiles of Angola
Reptiles of Botswana
Reptiles of the Democratic Republic of the Congo
Reptiles of Namibia
Reptiles of Zambia
Reptiles of Zimbabwe
Okavango mud turtle
Taxa named by Vivian Frederick Maynard FitzSimons